Glottalization is the complete or partial closure of the glottis during the articulation of another sound. Glottalization of vowels and other sonorants is most often realized as creaky voice (partial closure). Glottalization of obstruent consonants usually involves complete closure of the glottis; another way to describe this phenomenon is to say that a glottal stop is made simultaneously with another consonant. In certain cases, the glottal stop can even wholly replace the voiceless consonant. The term 'glottalized' is also used for ejective and implosive consonants; see glottalic consonant for examples.

There are two other ways to represent glottalization of sonorants in the IPA: (a) the same way as ejectives, with an apostrophe; or (b) with the under-tilde for creaky voice. (In some typefaces, the apostrophe will occur above the m.)

Types
Glottalization varies along three parameters, all of which are continuums. The degree of glottalization varies from none (modal voice) through stiff voice and creaky voice to full glottal closure (glottal reinforcement or glottal replacement, described below). Full or partial closure of the glottis also allows glottalic airstream mechanisms to operate, producing ejective or implosive consonants; implosives may themselves have modal, stiff, or creaky voice. It is not always clear from linguistic descriptions if a language has a series of light ejectives or voiceless consonants with glottal reinforcement, or similarly if it has a series of light implosives or voiced consonants with glottal reinforcement. The airstream parameter is only known to be relevant to obstruents, but the first two are involved with both obstruents and sonorants, including vowels.

Glottal replacement
When a phoneme is completely substituted by a glottal stop , one speaks of glottaling or glottal replacement. This is, for instance, very common in British English dialects such as Cockney and Estuary English dialects. 'Water' can be pronounced  – the glottal stop has superseded the 't' sound. Other examples include "city" , "bottle" , "Britain" , "seniority" . In some consonant clusters, glottal replacement of /t/ is common even among RP speakers. Geordie English has a unique form of glottalization involving glottal replacement of t, k, and p, for example in "metro", "thank you", and "people".

Glottal replacement also occurs in Indonesian, where syllable final  is produced as a glottal stop. In Hawaiian, the glottal stop is reconstructed to have come from other Proto-Polynesian consonants. The following table displays the shift  →  as well as the shift  → .

Glottal replacement is not purely a feature of consonants.  Yanesha' has three vowel qualities (and ) that have phonemic contrasts between short, long, and "laryngeal" or glottalized forms.  While the latter generally consists of creaky phonation, there is some allophony involved.  In pre-final contexts, a variation occurs (especially before voiced consonants) ranging from creaky phonation throughout the vowel to a sequence of a vowel, glottal stop, and a slightly rearticulated vowel:  ('deer') → .

Glottal reinforcement

English

In the English dialects exhibiting pre-glottalization, the consonants in question are usually glottalized in the coda position: "what" , "fiction" , "milkman" , "opera" . To a certain extent, some varieties of English have free variation between glottal replacement and glottal reinforcement.

See also

 Ejective consonant
 Glottalic consonant
 Guttural
 Implosive consonant
 Stød
 T-glottalization

Notes

References

Bibliography
Glottalization

English accents

External links
  Kortlandt, Frederik. Glottalization, Preaspiration and Gemination in English and Scandinavian. Doc PDF.
  Kortland, Frederik. How Old is the English Glottal Stop?. Doc PDF.
  Docherty, G. et al. Descriptive Adequacy in Phonology: a variationist perspective. Doc PDF.
  Kerswill, P. Dialect Levelling and Geographical Diffusion in British English. Doc PDF.
  Przedlacka, J. Estuary English and RP: Some Recent Findings. Doc PDF.
  Wells, J.C. Site of the UCL (University College of London) Department of Phonetics and Linguistics. Web documents relating to Estuary English.

 
Phonetics